Han Yi (born 31 January 1993) is a Chinese footballer currently playing as a forward for Xinjiang Tianshan Leopard F.C..

Career statistics

Club
.

References

1993 births
Living people
Chinese footballers
Association football forwards
China League One players
China League Two players
Dalian Shide F.C. players
Shanghai Shenhua F.C. players
Beijing Sport University F.C. players
Zibo Cuju F.C. players